Karakul may refer to:

Wool
Karakul sheep, a breed of domestic sheep and its pelt or wool
Karakul (hat), a style of cap made with the aforementioned pelt or wool, traditionally worn in Central and South Asia

Places
Karakul (China), a lake in Xinjiang Province
Karakul, Arkhangelsky District, Bashkortostan 
Karakul, Karmaskalinsky District, Bashkortostan 
Karakul deposit, Russian cobalt resource
Karakul (Tajikistan), a lake in the Pamir Mountains
Qarah Kul, Iran
Qaraqullar, Azerbaijan
Qorako‘l, Uzbekistan, a city in Bukhara Province (also spelled as Karakul)
Qorako‘l District, Uzbekistan (also spelled as Karakul)

Other 
 Karakul (song), a song in the album Crush by Floating Points

See also
Karakol (disambiguation)
Qaragol (disambiguation)
Karagöl (disambiguation)